The Fourth Wall or Breaking the Fourth Wall may refer to:

 Fourth wall, a term for the imaginary "wall" through which theater audiences watch the action of a play

"The Fourth Wall"
 The Fourth Wall (Milne play), a 1929 play by A. A. Milne
 The Fourth Wall (Gurney play), a 1992 play
 The Fourth Wall (novel), a 2012 novel by Walter Jon Williams
 The Fourth Wall (audio drama), a 2012 Doctor Who audio drama
 Fourth Wall (album), a 1981 album by The Flying Lizards
 4th Wall (album), a 2023 album by Ruel
 4th Wall Theatre, Inc., a theatre company in Bloomfield, New Jersey
 The Fourth Wall, a 2012 artist book by Max Pinckers

"Breaking the Fourth Wall"
 Breaking the Fourth Wall (album), a 2014 live album and video by Dream Theater
 "Breaking the Fourth Wall" (WandaVision), the seventh episode of the 2021 American television series WandaVision
 Breaking the Fourth Wall, a 2018 EP by the Slovenian metal band Negligence (band)